The Apostolic Nunciature to Estonia is an ecclesiastical office of the Catholic Church in Estonia. It is a diplomatic post of the Holy See, whose representative is called the Apostolic Nuncio with the rank of an ambassador.

Representatives 
Apostolic delegates to the Baltic States
Edward O'Rourke (8 December 1920 - December 1921)
Antonino Zecchini (20 October 1922 - 22 October 1933)
Apostolic nuncios
Antonino Arata (12 July 1935  - August 1940)
Justo Mullor García (30 November 1991 - 2 April 1997)
Erwin Josef Ender (9 July 1997 - 19 May 2001)
Peter Stephan Zurbriggen (25 October 2001 - 14 January 2009)
Luigi Bonazzi (14 March 2009 - 18 December 2013)
Pedro López Quintana (22 March 2014 - 4 March 2019)
Petar Rajič (6 August 2019 - present)

See also
Foreign relations of the Holy See
List of diplomatic missions of the Holy See

References

Estonia
 
Estonia–Holy See relations
Lists of ambassadors to Estonia